Antony Deago Carbone (July 15, 1925 – October 7, 2020) was an American film and television actor.

Biography
Carbone was born as Antonio Giuseppe Carmelo Carbone in Calabria, Italy on July 15, 1925. His family moved to Syracuse, New York when he was a young boy, and his name was changed to Antony Deago Carbone. The family later relocated to Los Angeles, California.

After graduating from Los Angeles State College, he moved to New York City to study drama with Harold Clurman and Eva Le Gallienne. He started his professional acting career in small parts in various Broadway productions before moving into film and television.

He was probably best known for his supporting roles in several low-budget horror films by Roger Corman in the late 1950s and early 1960s. In 1968, Carbone appeared (credited as Anthony Carbone) as the first Mexican on The Big Valley, in the episode titled "Miranda."

From the mid-1980s, he worked as a stage director in Los Angeles. Carbone died in Long Beach, California in October 2020, at the age of 95.

Filmography

 Arson for Hire (1959) as Foxy Gilbert
 Inside the Mafia (1959) as Kronis - Lucero's Pilot (uncredited)
 A Bucket of Blood (1959) as Leonard de Santis
 Last Woman on Earth (1960) as Harold Gern
 Creature from the Haunted Sea (1961) as Renzo Capetto
 Pit and the Pendulum (1961) as Dr. Charles Leon
 The Twilight Zone (1962) as Cristo 
 The Split (1968) as Man (uncredited)
 The Longest Night (TV movie, 1972) as Officer Jackson
 Extreme Close-Up aka Sex Through a Window (1973)
 A Case of Rape (TV Movie 1974) as Officer Carbone
 The Last Porno Flick aka Those Mad, Mad Moviemaker (1974) as Vittorio
 Newman's Law (1974) as Policeman Gino
 Rich Man, Poor Man (1976) as Lou Martin
 Vigilante Force (1976) as Freddie Howe
 Skateboard (1978) as Sol
 Avalanche (1978) as Leo the Coach
 Marciano (TV Movie - 1979) as Dr. Collyer
 Destination America (TV movie, 1987)

References

External links
 

1925 births
2020 deaths
People from Calabria
American male film actors
American male television actors
20th-century American male actors
Italian emigrants to the United States
Los Angeles State College alumni